Theophilus Jones (2 September 1666 – 14 March 1742) was an Irish Member of Parliament. He sat in the House of Commons of Ireland from 1692 until his death in 1742.

He lived in Headfort, near Drumsna, County Leitrim.

He was a Member of Parliament for Sligo Borough from 1692 to 1695, and then for Leitrim from 1695 to 1742.

His grandson Theophilus Jones (1729–1811) was a member of Parliament and a Privy Councillor.

References
 

1666 births
1742 deaths
Irish MPs 1692–1693
Irish MPs 1695–1699
Irish MPs 1703–1713
Irish MPs 1713–1714
Irish MPs 1715–1727
Irish MPs 1727–1760
Politicians from County Leitrim
Members of the Parliament of Ireland (pre-1801) for County Sligo constituencies
Members of the Parliament of Ireland (pre-1801) for County Leitrim constituencies